Wake/Lift is the second full-length album by post-metal band Rosetta. The album was released on October 2, 2007 through Translation Loss Records on CD, with a limited-edition double LP prepared for late 2008.

This album is the first to not be entirely engineered by the band. It is also Rosetta's first to be recorded to analog tape. Consequently, the production on Wake/Lift is more refined than the band's previous works.

Release
Months before the album's release, the band had been performing "Red in Tooth and Claw" at live show as far back as April 2007.

The track "Wake" was posted on the MySpace for Translation Loss Records in a low-quality format on August 17, 2007, and again later on Rosetta's own MySpace on August 19, 2007.

A component disc, entitled The Cleansing Undertones of Wake/Lift, was released alongside Wake/Lift. It contains a collection of ambient samples used by Armine. It is, however, not meant to be synchronized with Wake/Lift (as The Galilean Satellites was); Armine "purposely designed The Cleansing Undertones of Wake/Lift to make Wake/Lift sound terrible if played together".

In September 2008, the album was remastered and pressed on 180 gram vinyl. It comes in three limited-edition color combinations. It was released 11 Nov 2008

Style
Guitarist J. Matthew Weed has stated that the band has taken on a more melodic, technical, and experimental sound. Rather than sounding entirely like the metal style of The Galilean Satellites, Wake/Lift falls more into the post-rock genre while retaining space rock and hardcore influences.

Lyrically and thematically, the album deals much less with astronomical concepts and is more influenced by vocalist Mike Armine's experiences as a teacher. He states,

Track listing

Temet nosce is Latin for "know thyself".

Personnel
Michael Armine – sound manipulation, vocals
David Grossman – bass guitar
Bruce McMurtrie Jr. – drums
J. Matthew Weed – electric guitar, mixing
Colin Marston – mastering
Paul Romano – cover art

References

Rosetta (band) albums
2007 albums